Jacques Renavand (born 12 November 1939) is a French former tennis player.

Career
Renavand was active on tour in the late 1950s and early 1960s. He played for the France Davis Cup team in 1961 and 1962, with his appearances including a Europe Zone semi tie against Italy. In 1963 he made the fourth round of the French Championships, winning three successive five-set matches en route.

Retiring from tennis at the age of 24, Renavand went on to manage a famous nightclub in Paris called the Chez Castel.

Personal life
Renavand's wife Isabelle is the daughter of former French Prime Minister Félix Gaillard. His two sons, Nicolas and Olivier, were professional tennis players.

See also
List of France Davis Cup team representatives

References

External links
 
 
 

1939 births
Living people
French male tennis players